Seyyed Yaddam (also Romanized as Seyyed Yaddām) is a village in Elhayi Rural District, in the Central District of Ahvaz County, Khuzestan Province, Iran. At the 2006 census, its population was 106, in 17 families.

References 

Populated places in Ahvaz County